Pope Pius VI (r. 1775–1799) created 73 cardinals in 23 consistories.

April 24, 1775

 Leonardo Antonelli
 Bernardino de' Vecchi

May 29, 1775

 Giovanni Carlo Bandi

July 17, 1775

 Francesco Maria Banditi
 Ignazio Boncompagni-Ludovisi

November 13, 1775

 Juan Tomás de Boxadors

April 15, 1776

 Luigi Valenti Gonzaga, in pectore 
 Giovanni Archinto

May 20, 1776

 Guido Calcagnini
 Angelo Maria Durini

June 23, 1777

June 1, 1778

July 12, 1779

 Franziskus Herzan von Harras
 Alessandro Mattei

December 11, 1780

 Paolo Francesco Antamori

December 16, 1782

 Giuseppe Maria Capece Zurlo
 Raniero Finocchietti

September 20, 1784

 Giovanni Andrea Archetti

February 14, 1785

 Giuseppe Garampi
 Giuseppe Doria Pamphili
 Vincenzo Ranuzzi
 Carlo Bellisomi
 Nicola Colonna di Stigliano
 Gregorio Barnaba Chiaramonti
 Muzio Gallo
 Giovanni de Gregorio
 Giovanni Maria Riminaldi
 Paolo Massei
 Francesco Carrara
 Ferdinando Spinelli
 Antonio Maria Doria Pamphilj
 Carlo Livizzani

December 18, 1786

 Romualdo Braschi-Onesti

January 27, 1787

 Filippo Carandini

April 7, 1788

 José Francisco Miguel António de Mendoça

December 15, 1788

 Étienne Charles de Loménie de Brienne

March 30, 1789

 Antonino de Sentmenat y Cartellá
 Francisco Antonio de Lorenzana
 Ignazio Busca
 Vittorio Gaetano Costa d'Arignano
 Louis-Joseph de Montmorency-Laval
 Joseph Franz Auersperg
 Stefano Borgia
 Tommaso Antici
 Filippo Campanelli

August 3, 1789

 Ludovico Flangini

September 26, 1791

 Fabrizio Ruffo

June 18, 1792

 Giovanni Battista Caprara

February 21, 1794

 Antonio Dugnani
 Ippolito Antonio Vincenti Mareri
 Jean-Sifrein Maury
 Giovanni Battista Bussi de Pretis
 Francesco Maria Pignatelli
 Aurelio Roverella
 Giovanni Rinuccini
 Filippo Lancellotti

June 1, 1795

 Giulio Maria della Somaglia

References

Pius 6
18th-century Catholicism
Pope Pius VI
College of Cardinals